5 raske piger is a 1933 Danish comedy film directed by A. W. Sandberg and starring Karina Bell.

Cast
 Karina Bell as Annie From
 Marguerite Viby as Karin From
 Tove Wallenstrøm as Grace From
 Nanna Stenersen as Irene From
 Vesla Stenersen as Maud From
 Frederik Jensen as Steen
 Jonna Neiiendam as Agatha Steen
 Albrecht Schmidt as Sshwartz
 Erling Schroeder as Jørgen Steen
  as Sigurd
 Eigil Reimers as Knud
 Helmuth Larsen as Richard
 Per Gundmann as Willy
 Arthur Jensen as Pjevs
 Carl Fisher as Jeppe
 Holger-Madsen as Regissør
 Bjarne Forchhammer as Frantz
 Bjørn Spiro as Påtrængende mand
 Kai Ewans
 Carl Fischer as Jeppe
 Leo Mathisen
 Poul Reichhardt as Mand der bærer køje

External links

1933 films
1933 comedy films
Danish comedy films
1930s Danish-language films
Danish black-and-white films
Films directed by A. W. Sandberg